Living Undocumented is a 2019 Netflix documentary series co-directed by Aaron Saidman and Anna Chai and executive produced by Selena Gomez, Mandy Teefey, Eli Holzman, Aaron Saidman, Sean O’Grady and Anna Chai. The series documents eight undocumented immigrant families living in the United States. The series was produced by Industrial Media-owned production company The Intellectual Property Corporation. It was released on October 2, 2019.

According to an op-ed written by Gomez for Time on October 1, 2019, Gomez said she was approached about the project in 2017 and decided to become involved after watching footage that captured "the shame, uncertainty, and fear I saw my own family struggle with. But it also captured the hope, optimism, and patriotism so many undocumented immigrants still hold in their hearts despite the hell they go through.”

Episodes

Release
Living Undocumented was released on October 2, 2019 on Netflix.

Reception
Review aggregator Rotten Tomatoes reported an approval rating of 100% based on 5 reviews, with an average rating of 9/10 for the series.

References

External links
 

2010s American documentary television series
English-language Netflix original programming
Netflix original documentary television series